Barren County Schools is a public school district in Barren County, Kentucky, United States, based in Glasgow, Kentucky.

Schools 
The Barren County School District has seven elementary schools, one middle school and two high schools.

Elementary schools
Austin-Tracy Elementary School 
Eastern Elementary 
Hiseville Elementary School 
North Jackson Elementary 
Park City Elementary School 
Red Cross Elementary School 
Temple Hill Elementary School

Middle schools
Barren County Middle Schools (Grades 7–8)

High schools
Barren County High School (Grades 10–12)
Trojan Academy (Grade 9)

References

External links
 Barren County Schools

School districts in Kentucky
Education in Barren County, Kentucky